Paxos is a Greek island in the Ionian Sea, lying just south of Corfu. The main town and the seat of the municipality is Gaios.

Paxos lies some 15 km from the southern tip of Corfu, and at about the same distance from the town of Parga on the mainland. It is connected by ferry lines from Igoumenitsa and Corfu with Gaios. The island is hilly, the highest point having an elevation of 230 m.

In Greek mythology, Poseidon created the island by striking Corfu with his trident, so that he and his wife Amphitrite could have some peace and quiet.

History
Although it was possibly inhabited from prehistoric times, the Phoenicians are traditionally held to have been the first settlers on Paxos. The name is believed to be derived from Pax, which meant trapezoidal in their language.

This island is noted for the Battle of Paxos, fought between the ancient Greek and Illyrian fleets during the First Illyrian War in 229 BC. The battle is recorded by the ancient historian Polybius (The Histories, book 2, chapter 2).

The Romans ruled the island from the 2nd century BC, and during the Byzantine period and Middle Ages it was constantly attacked by pirates. After various rulers and Crusaders had passed through, the island was taken by the Venetians at the end of the 14th century.

During the Napoleonic wars, the Ionian Islands were taken by the French and the Russo-Turkish alliance.  On 13 February 1814, the island of Paxos surrendered to the Royal Navy frigate HMS Apollo and 160 troops from the 2nd Greek Light Infantry from Cephalonia and the 35th Regiment of the Royal Corsican Rangers. In 1815, the United Kingdom established the Ionian Union. In 1864, together with the rest of the Heptanese, Paxos was ceded to Greece.

Geography

Paxos lies some 15 km from the southern tip of Corfu, and at about the same distance from the town of Parga on the mainland. 

Much of the hilly landscape is covered in olive groves. These stretch from Lakka, the harbour community in the north, through Magazia to Gaios, the capital. Coastal communities of Gaios, Lakka and Longos on the east coast are the three main settlements, while the interior features numerous scattered hamlets. The west coast is dominated by steep white, chalky cliffs that are greatly eroded at sea level, and harbour many "blue caves". The highest point of the island is Agios Isavros at an elevation of 231 m. Several islets lie very close to the coast of Paxos: Agios Nikolaos and Panagia protect the harbor of Gaios, while Mongonisi and Kaltsonisi lie off the southeastern tip. Antipaxos lies some 5 km further southeast.

Olive oil making, soap manufacture and fishing were supplanted by tourism as the main industry in the mid sixties, resulting in a construction boom, which has greatly altered the coastline around Gaios, the capital of the Paxiot demos (community).

Province
The province of Paxoi was one of the provinces of the Corfu Prefecture. Its territory corresponded with that of the current municipality Paxoi. It was abolished in 2006.

Foreign residents
Among well known semi-permanent British inhabitants were Audrey Good, former commander of the UN refugee bases in Epirus following the Greek Civil War, actor Peter Bull (author of It Isn't All Greek to Me) and actress Susannah York. Some members of the Agnelli family (of FIAT fame) have built a palatial holiday home—complete with faux medieval tower—on a small island of (Kaltonisi) situated near the southernmost tip ('the heel') of Paxos, close to the beach of Mongonissi. The presence of such residents, and the development of the coastal area (mostly by Italian nationals) explains why Paxos has now become one of the most expensive pieces of real estate in Greece.

Paxos is part of a European network called Cultural Village of Europe. The annual Paxos Festival was founded by John Gough, and is now organised by the Guildhall School of Music and Drama in London, and attracts some of Europe's finest young performers. This festival events usually take place between June to September and are usually held in the disused school of Longos.

Transport
The island is serviced by combined passenger and vehicle ferries which operate year-round from the port of Igoumenitsa on the mainland of Greece (1.5 hours). In the tourist season hydrofoils, passenger ferries and sea-taxis operate from Corfu (1-2 hours). A hydrofoil passenger service operates outside the tourist season, but is infrequent and weather dependent. Winter visitors should anticipate occasional periods of isolation.

Dialect

A dialect is spoken resembling that of Corfu and having a similar prosody. It is heavily influenced by Italian.

Communities and settlements 

Antipaxos (nearby island)
Mogonisi (nearby island)
Panagia (nearby island)
Agios Nikolaos (nearby island)
Katsonisi (nearby island)
Apergatika
Argyratika
Arvanitakeika
Aronatika
Dalietatika
Gaios (seat)
Gramatikeika
Lakka (second-largest settlement)
Loggos (third-largest settlement)
Magazia
Makratika
Ozias
Platanos (or Fontana / Fountana)
Velianitatika (or Veliantatika)
Vlachopoulatika
Zenebissatika

References

External links

Paxos International Music Festival
The Prefecture of Corfu official page

Populated places in Corfu (regional unit)
Mediterranean port cities and towns in Greece
Islands of the Ionian Islands (region)
Islands of Greece
Municipalities of the Ionian Islands (region)
Provinces of Greece
Septinsular Republic
Phoenician colonies in Greece
Landforms of Corfu (regional unit)